{{DISPLAYTITLE:C21H22N2O3}}
The molecular formula C21H22N2O3 (molar mass: 350.41 g/mol, exact mass: 350.1630 u) may refer to:

 NNC-711
 Perakine
 Vomilenine

Molecular formulas